Kwang-Chu Chao (Traditional Chinese: 趙廣緒; Simplified Chinese: 赵广绪; June 7, 1925 - October 12, 2013), was an American chemist and chemical engineer.

Chao is the Harry Creighton Pfeffer Distinguished Professor Emeritus of Chemical Engineering at Purdue University. He is also the President of American Zhu Kezhen Education Foundation.

Chao graduated (B.S.) from the Department of Chemistry, National Chekiang University (aka Zhejiang University) in 1948. He obtained his M.S. (1952) and Ph.D. (1956) both from the University of Wisconsin.

Works

Books written and edited by Chao:
 Phase Equilibrium in Coal Liquefaction Processes (Author: Kwang-chu Chao)
 Applied Thermodynamics (Author: Kwang-chu Chao; ISBN B000HDABIG; Publisher:    American Chemical Society; 1968)
 Thermodynamics of Fluid - An Introduction to Equilibrium Theory (Author: Kwang-chu Chao)

References

External links
 Chinese American Organizations & Associations 
 Kwang-Chu Chao's homepage at Purdue University 

1925 births
2013 deaths
American chemists
Taiwanese emigrants to the United States
Zhejiang University alumni
University of Wisconsin–Madison College of Engineering alumni
Purdue University faculty
American people of Chinese descent